Peter William Unwin  (born 20 May 1932) is a British writer and retired diplomat. He was Ambassador to Hungary from 1983 to 1986 and Ambassador to Denmark from 1986 to 1988. He served as Deputy Secretary General of the Commonwealth from 1989 to 1993. Having retired from the Diplomatic Service, he is an author and occasional contributor to The Times.

Military service
On 5 February 1955, as part of National Service, Unwin was commissioned into the Intelligence Corps, British Army, as a second lieutenant. On 25 September 1956, he was transferred to the Army Emergency Reserve of Officers. He was promoted to lieutenant on 18 November 1956.

Career

Diplomatic career
On 2 September 1956, Unwin joined the Foreign Service as an Officer in Branch A.

Works

References

1932 births
Living people
Ambassadors of the United Kingdom to Denmark
Ambassadors of the United Kingdom to Hungary
Commonwealth Deputy Secretaries-General
British writers
Intelligence Corps officers
Companions of the Order of St Michael and St George